Tubualá or Dubwala is an island town in the Guna Yala province of Panama.

Tubualá is served by Tubualá Airport.

Sources 
OpenStreetMap - Tubualá
Google Maps - Tubualá

Road-inaccessible communities of Panama
Populated places in Guna Yala